The Virginia Cavaliers college football team represents the University of Virginia in the Atlantic Coast Conference (ACC). The Cavaliers compete as part of the NCAA Division I Football Bowl Subdivision. The program has had 42 head coaches since it began play during the 1887 season. Since December 2021, Tony Elliott has served as head coach at Virginia.

Four coaches have led Virginia in postseason bowl games: George Welsh, Al Groh, Mike London, and Bronco Mendenhall. Three of those coaches also won conference championships: Joseph M. Wood and Harry Varner each captured one as a member of the South Atlantic Intercollegiate Athletic Association; and Welsh captured two as a member of the Atlantic Coast Conference.

Welsh is the leader in overall wins and seasons coached with 134 wins during his 19 years as head coach. Merritt Cooke Jr. has the highest winning percentage at 0.938. Dick Voris has the lowest winning percentage of those who have coached more than one game, with 0.033. Of the 42 different head coaches who have led the Cavaliers, George Sanford, Greasy Neale, Earl Abell, Frank Murray, and Welsh has been inducted into the College Football Hall of Fame.

Key

Coaches

Notes

References

Virginia

Virginia Cavaliers football coaches